The New York–Penn League of Minor League Baseball was a professional baseball league in the United States from 1939 to 2020. A league champion was determined at the end of each season. Champions were determined by postseason playoffs, winning the regular season pennant, or being declared champion by the league office. In its final season of operation, three division winners and a wild card team (the team with the best second-place record in the league) were determined at the end of the season. The division champion with the highest winning percentage played the wild card team, while the other two division champions played one another in best-of-three series. The winners then played each other in a best-of-three series to determine a league champion.

League champions
Score and finalist information is only presented when postseason play occurred. The lack of this information indicates a declared league champion.

Championship wins by team

Notes
 Auburn and Oneonta were declared co-champions when torrential rains in Central New York rendered both teams' fields unplayable.
 Brooklyn and Williamsport were declared co-champions after the playoffs were cancelled in the wake the September 11 terrorist attacks.

References

C
New York-Penn
New York-Penn League champions
New York-Penn League